The IBM ThinkPad 570 is a notebook series from the ThinkPad line by IBM.

Models

Comparison

References

External links 
 Thinkwiki.de - 570

IBM laptops
ThinkPad